Nkosi is a Nguni word for “king”, “chief“ and ”lord”.

”Nkosi” is a common name and surname amongst Nguni people, and may refer to:
Nkosi Johnson (1989–2001), South African child with HIV/AIDS who made a powerful impact on public perceptions of the pandemic
Duma Nkosi (1957–2021), mayor of the Ekurhuleni Metropolitan Municipality from 2001 to 2008
Given Nkosi, South African opera singer (tenor)
Kwanele Nkosi, character in the post-apocalyptic young adult horror novel The Dead by Charlie Higson
Lewis Nkosi (1936–2010), South African writer and essayist
Mxolisi Sizo Nkosi (born 1967 in Soweto, South Africa), senior official in the government of South Africa
Siyabonga Nkosi (born 1981), South African footballer
Themba Mbongeni Nkosi or Euphonik (born 1983), South African DJ, music producer and radio presenter
West Nkosi (1940–1998), South African music producer, saxophonist and songwriter
Willis Nkosi, South African Army officer
Nkosi Nofuma (born 1988), South African rugby union player currently playing with the Border Bulldogs
Nkosi Ntsikayezwe Sigcau (1947–1996), South African anti-Apartheid activist
S’busiso Nkosi (born 1996), South African rugby union player
Thoko Nkosi  God in a disguise

See also
"Nkosi Sikelel' iAfrika" ("Lord Bless Africa"), a hymn composed in 1897 by Enoch Sontonga, which became a pan-African liberation anthem and was later adopted as the national anthem of several African countries
Kosi (disambiguation)
Pankosi
Sun Kosi

Bantu-language surnames